Jilin University (JLU; ; often abbreviated as ) is a leading national research university located in Changchun, China. It is under the direct jurisdiction of China's Ministry of Education. It is a Chinese Ministry of Education Class A Double First Class University. It is strongly supported by state key projects such as Double First Class University Plan, former Project 985, Project 211 and Project 2011. 

Jilin University is consistently ranked as one of the most prestigious universities in China, and has research projects in automobile engineering, chemistry, computer science, electrical engineering and biology be identified as internationally renowned. In 2017, the university is supported to achieve Class A "world-class" academic status under the Double First Class University Plan by China.

History
Founded in 1946 as the Northeast College of Administration in Harbin, Heilongjiang, Jilin University merged with many universities and colleges and changed its name many times. In May 1948, the Northeast Administration College merged with the Harbin University and was renamed Northeast Academy of Science. In November 1948, the Northeast Academy of Science moved to Shenyang, Liaoning and restored the name of Northeast Administration College. In 1950, it was renamed as Northeast People's University. After the Korean War broke out, it was relocated to Changchun, Jilin. In 1958, it was renamed Jilin University.

In 2000, the former Jilin University, the former Jilin University of Technology, the former Norman Bethune University of Medical Sciences, the former Changchun University of Science and Technology (established 1951) and the former Changchun Institute of Posts and Telecommunications combined to form the current Jilin University. On August 29, 2004, the former University of Military Logistics also merged with JLU. The university established a campus in Zhuhai in 2003.

Academics

The university has seven campuses in six districts that are home to 47 colleges covering 13 academic disciplines, including philosophy, economics, law, literature, education, history, science, engineering, agriculture, medicine, management, military science and art. The university has five state key laboratories, one national engineering laboratory, six national-local joint laboratories, one national engineering and technology research center, six humanities and social science key research bases of the Ministry of Education, ten key laboratories of the Ministry of Education, five engineering research centers of the Ministry of Education and 18 key laboratories of other ministries.

It is a comprehensive and national key university. JLU offers a variety of degree programs. It has 129 undergraduate programs, 304 Master's degree programs, 244 doctoral degree programs, and 42 centers for post-doctoral studies, 47 first-class university and discipline construction projects. There are 73,702 full-time students, with 27,397 postgraduate students, 43,260 undergraduate and college students, over 2,000 overseas students.

There are 6,657 faculty members in total, among which there are 2,110 professors and 1,618 doctoral advisors. There are 43 members of Chinese Academy of Sciences or Chinese Academy of Engineering (including 33 adjunct members), 7 senior professors of philosophical and social sciences, 20 members of assessment group of the Academic Degrees Committee of the State Council, 29 involved in the “Ten Thousand Talents Program”, 8 national-level outstanding teachers, 5 chief experts in research and construction projects of the Marxism theory in the central government, 6 chief scientists in the national “Program 973”, 15 young and middle-aged experts with prominent contribution, 59 selected in the “Changjiang Scholars Program”, 33 winners of the “National Outstanding Youth Fund”, 31 winners of “National Excellent Youth Fund” and 90 selected in “Changbai Mountain Scholars” in Jilin Province.

Rankings and reputation 
Jilin University was one of the Project 985 universities in China to appear in the world’s top 500 universities in the first global university ranking in 2003, according to the Academic Ranking of World Universities. The joint THE-QS World University Rankings 2005 ranked Jilin University =245th in the world. 

As of 2021, the CWTS Leiden Ranking table 2021 ranked Jilin University at 11th in the world based on their publications for the time period 2016–2019. In 2021, it ranked 70th among the universities around the world by SCImago Institutions Rankings. The university ranked 66th among the leading institutions globally in the Nature Index 2021 Annual Tables by Nature Research, that measure the high-quality research published in 82 high-quality science journals.

The University Ranking By Academic Performance (URAP) 2021/22 ranked Jilin University at 105th globally. Jilin University ranked 223rd worldwide and 23rd nationwide in the Center for World University Ranking (CWUR) 2022/23.

Facilities

There are more than 50 multimedia and language learning audiovisual classrooms. Special attention has been paid to the construction of 20 basic science laboratories.

The university library claims a collection of 7.57 million books and is designated as the library of United Nations Educational, Scientific and Cultural Organization (UNESCO), United Nations Industrial Development Organization (UNIDO) and World Bank. It serves as the Comprehensive Information Center of Liberal Arts of the Education Ministry, the only Foreign Scientific Text Book Center in Northeast China, and the National Humanities and Social Science Higher Education Books Import Center. It is one of the seven centers of China Academic Library and Information System (CALIS) Center in Northeast China.

Several campuses have gymnasiums, stadiums, and arenas for basketball, volleyball, table tennis and artistic gymnastics. The Nanling Campus Stadium, which has a grass soccer field surrounded by standard synthetic racetracks, has 10,000 seats. There are tennis and basketball courts throughout the campus.

Jilin University has established ties with more than 289 universities, colleges, and research institutes in 39 countries/districts. Over 2,000 foreign students currently attend the university.

People

Notable alumni

Du Qinglin - politician, vice chairman of Chinese People's Political Consultative Conference, Head of the United Front Work Department of the Central Committee.
Hu Huaibang - chairman of China Development Bank.
Li Congjun -former President of China's Xinhua News Agency.
Liu Qibao - head of the Propaganda Department of the Central Committee.
Liu Xiaobo - 2010 Nobel Peace Prize winner
Liu Yandong - Vice Premier of the People's Republic of China
Lü Fuyuan - first minister of the Ministry of Commerce of the People's Republic of China.
Wang Gang (politician) -Director of the General Office of the Chinese Communist Party
Wang Gongquan -  liberal activist, main leader and financial backer of the New Citizens' Movement
Wang Yongqing - Secretary-General of the Central Political and Legal Affairs Commission
Wang Jiarui - Vice Chairman of the Chinese People's Political Consultative Conference, director of the International Liaison Department of the Chinese Communist Party from 2003 to 2015.
Xu Shaoshi - former Chairman of the National Development and Reform Commission of the People's Republic of China, party chief of Minister of Land and Resources
Xu Xianming - China's leading authority on human rights law
Yin Weimin - Minister of Human Resources and Social Security and a deputy head of the Organization Department of the Chinese Communist Party.
Zhang Jun (politician) - Chinese politician and former judge, serving currently as the Deputy Secretary of the Central Commission for Discipline Inspection the country's top anti-corruption body, and the Minister of Justice. He formerly served as Vice Minister of the Ministry of Justice of the People's Republic of China and Vice President of the Supreme People's Court.

Notable faculty

Andrey Baykov - Russian international relations scholar, Vice-Rector of Moscow State University of International Relations.
Barry Buzan - Emeritus Professor at the London School of Economics,  fellow of the British Academy
Yury Gogotsi - leading Ukrainian scientist in the field of material chemistry, professor at Drexel University,  founder and director of the A.J. Drexel Nanotechnology Institute
Chen Jia'er - nuclear physicist, an accelerator physicist and an academician of the Chinese Academy of Sciences.
Han Dayuan -  President of the Chinese Constitutional Law Society in Renmin University of China
Huai Jinpeng -  computer scientist,  party secretary of the China Association for Science and Technology 
Loide Kasingo - member of the South West Africa People's Organization and National Assembly of Namibia, Deputy Speaker of Parliament.
Kai Li - professor at the department of Computer Science in Princeton University
Li Siguang - founder of China's geomechanics,  first present of former Changchun Institute of Geology (now as College of Earth Sciences, Jilin University).
Lawrence Lau - Hong Kong economist and the former Vice-Chancellor of the Chinese University of Hong Kong.
Long Yifei - Associate Dean of Renmin University of China Law School
Alan MacDiarmid - winner of Nobel Prize in Chemistry.
Wilma Olson - professor at the BioMaPS institute for Quantitative Biology at Rutgers University.,  visiting professor at the Polymer Chemistry Department of the Jilin University.
Helmut Ringsdorf - polymer Chemist, known for being the first to propose covalently bonding drugs to water-soluble polymers.
Steve Smith (academic) - international relations theorist,  Vice Chancellor of the University of Exeter and Professor of International Studies.
Song Yuquan, materials scientist, academician of the Chinese Academy of Sciences.
Sun Weiguo -  president of Xihua University
Tang Aoqing or Au-Chin Tang, theoretical chemist, President of Jilin University, member of the Chinese Academy of Sciences
Wang Xianghao - mathematician who introduced the Grunwald–Wang theorem, correcting an error in Wilhelm Grunwald's original statement and proof of this.
Yevgeny Yasin - prominent Russian economist,  academic supervisor at the National Research University Higher School of Economics.
Ying Xu -  computational biologist and bioinformatician, chair professor in the Institute of Bioinformatics at the University of Georgia
You Xiaozeng -Chinese inorganic chemist, educator and an academician of the Chinese Academy of Sciences. 
Zhou Ji (Tsinghua University) - "Changjiang Scholar" distinguished Professor, at the School of Materials Science and Engineering, of Tsinghua University
Zhou Qifeng - Chinese chemist and academician of the Chinese Academy of Sciences,  President of Peking University.
Zhu Wenxiong - Chinese linguist.
Zhu Guangya - renowned Chinese nuclear physicist, head and first director of Jilin University Department of Physics

Colleges, Institutions and other Affiliated Organizations
There are 47 colleges or schools, as well as a few institutions and other affiliated organizations within 9 divisions in Jilin University, including:

Division of Humanities
School of Philosophy and Socialogy
College of Humanities
School of Archaeology
College of Foreign Languages
Art College
Physical Education College
School of Foreign Languages Education

Division of Social Sciences
School of Economics
School of Law
School of Public Administration
Business School
School of Marxism
Northeast Asian Studies College
School of Finance
School of International and Public Affairs

Division of Sciences
Mathematics School and Institute
College of Physics
College of Chemistry
College of Life Sciences

Division of Engineering
School of Mechanical and Aerospace Engineering
College of Automotive Engineering
School of Material Science and Engineering
School of Transportation
College of Biological and Agricultural Engineering
School of Management
College of Food Science and Engineering

Division of Information Sciences
College of Electronic Science and Engineering
College of Communication Engineering
College of Computer Science and Technology
Software Institute
Public Computer Education and Research Center

Division of Earth Sciences
College of Earth Sciences
College of Geo-exploration Science and Technology
Construction Engineering College
College of New Energy and Environment
College of Instrumentation and Electrical Engineering

Norman Bethune Health Science Center
(Main Page of NBHCC)
College of Basic Medical Science
School of Public Health
School of Pharmaceutical Sciences
School of Nursing
Clinical Medical College
The First Bethune Hospital
The Second Hospital
China-Japan Union Hospital (The Third Bethune Hospital)
Hospital of Stomatology

Division of Agricultural Sciences
College of Veterinary Medicine
College of Plant Science
College of Food Science and Engineering
Public Education Center
College of Animal Science
Institute of Zoonosis

Division of Interdisciplinary Research
School of Artificial Intelligence

Others
Applied Technology College
College of Economical Information
College of Business Administration
Zhuhai College
Dongrong College
Lambton College

See also
Badabu - Part of the university's Xinmin Campus

References

External links

 Jilin University (English) 

 
Universities and colleges in Changchun
Universities and colleges in Jilin
Universities in China with English-medium medical schools
Vice-ministerial universities in China
Project 211
Project 985
Changchun
Educational institutions established in 1946
1946 establishments in China